Alexis Demetrea Prousis (born 27 September 1984) is an American former professional tennis player.

An Illinois local, Prousis played collegiate tennis for Northwestern University between 2003 and 2007. A two-time All-American, she won the NCAA doubles championship in 2006, partnering Cristelle Grier. The pair were just the second in history from a Big Ten Conference team to win an NCAA title.

Prousis featured in the women's doubles main draw at the 2006 US Open and competed briefly on the professional tour after leaving college. She reached a career high singles ranking of 285 and won an ITF title in Los Mochis in 2008.

ITF finals

Singles: 1 (1–0)

Doubles: 4 (1–3)

References

External links
 
 

1984 births
Living people
American female tennis players
Tennis people from Illinois
Northwestern Wildcats women's tennis players
21st-century American women